Chris Ekiyor (born March 17, 1972) is a trained dental surgeon, and the President Emeritus of the Ijaw Youth Council. He is the founder of RAHI Medical Outreach, an NGO that meets the health needs of rural Africa with a focus on the Niger Delta region.

Early life 
Ekiyor was born on March 17, 1972. His father, Thompson F. Ekiyor, is a retired policeman.

Education 
Ekiyor attended GSS Rijau in Niger State, Nigeria, from 1984 until 1989. Following this, he attended the University of Benin, where he studied Dental Surgery in 2004. He also obtained his master's degree in Public Health from FUTO in 2015, and an MBA from Delta State University, Abraka, in 2016.

Career 
Ekiyor is the founder of RAHI Medical Outreach, Senator at Junior Chambers International (JCI) and the Convener of the Integration Summit Group, Nigeria (ISG-N).

He was the Transition Committee Chairman, Patani Local Government Area, and also the past Commissioner for Commerce and Industry, Delta State.

In 2008, Dr. Chris was awarded a Nonviolence Stage 3 trainer, from the center for Nonviolence, University of Rhodes Island, USA. He is also a recipient of the Nigerian Ambassador for Peace Award, BERN Switzerland. Youth Federation for World Peace Award (Geneva); Nonviolence Compliance Award from King-Lituli Transformation Centre, South Africa and Social Recognition Award from the University of East London Alumni Association (2016).

Boards and committees 
Dr. Ekiyor is a Member, Gothe governing board of the verning Board of Delta State University Teaching, Hospital, Oghara and a secretary of thes as a Secretary, Delta State Government Advocacy Committee against Oil Facility Vandalism.

Personal life 
Ekiyor is married to Gloria Ekiyor, with whom he has five children.

References

External links 

1972 births
Living people
Nigerian surgeons
Nigerian politicians